McGarrah may refer to:

James M. McGarrah (born 1951), United States Navy admiral
McGarrah Jessee, advertising agency based in Austin, Texas